The 2027 Pan American Games, officially the XX Pan American Games, is a forthcoming international multi-sport event scheduled to be held in Barranquilla, Colombia.

Bidding process
The bidding process to determine the host of the 2027 Pan American Games was to begin in January 2021. However, in July 2021, president of Panam Sports Neven Ilic confirmed that the bidding process would be postponed until January 2022. The deadline to submit bids for the event is November 15, 2021.

Host city election
On August 27, 2021, at an event in Barranquilla, Colombia, it was announced that the city would be the host of the games.

No vote was held, Barranquilla was appointed as host city.

Interested cities
 Buenos Aires, Argentina
Buenos Aires initially bid for the 2023 Pan American Games, but withdrew their bid for financial reasons. Gerardo Werthein, the president of the Argentine Olympic Committee (COA), stated, "I would like Argentina to present its Olympic candidacy for 2032, but for now I'm only thinking about [the PanAm Games in] 2027."

 Santa Cruz de la Sierra, Bolivia
On January 14, 2019, the Minister of Sports of Bolivia Tito Montaño expressed his interest for candidacy for the Pan American Games. Although a specific city has not been determined, Montaño stated that a candidate city will be determined within the coming weeks. Bolivia has never submitted a bid for the Games.

 Barranquilla, Colombia
On October 24, 2018, Mayor of Barranquilla Alejandro Char confirmed Barranquilla's interest in the 2023 Pan American Games. After a successful hosting of the 2018 Central American and Caribbean Games, Char was inspired to meet with Panam Sports President Neven Ilić Álvarez. After the meeting, Char told reporters, "After this meeting I’m feeling more calm, confident and sure than ever that we can do it ... We are going to do everything in our power to make the advancements to hold the Games that Barranquilla wants and deserves."

Venues

The Games

Participating National Olympic Committees
All 41 nations who are members of the Pan American Sports Organization are expected to compete.

See also
2025 Junior Pan American Games
2026 South American Games
2026 Central American and Caribbean Games
2027 Parapan American Games
2028 Summer Olympics
2032 Summer Olympics

References

 
Pan American Games 2027
2027 in multi-sport events
Pan American Games
International sports competitions hosted by Colombia
Multi-sport events in Colombia
2027 in South American sport